Shameless is a celebrity and pop culture podcast hosted by Melbourne journalists Zara McDonald and Michelle Andrews. Created "for smart people who love dumb stuff", Shameless delves into the pop culture stories of the week in every Monday episode. The New York Times described Shameless as "a fun one for pop aficionados... it feels like chiming into a conversation between two very up-to-date friends. But as with all great pop culture discussion, Shameless taps into bigger themes that hide beneath and how a zeitgeist can change the way we think." Shameless launched on March 12, 2018, with weekly Monday episodes. Later that year, Andrews and McDonald launched Thursday 'In Conversation' episodes, in which they interview a well-known person.

History
Michelle Andrews and Zara McDonald first worked together as colleagues at women's media company Mamamia, where they pitched the podcast concept for Shameless. Upon its rejection, the pair began working on Shameless independently, and left their roles at Mamamia to pursue the podcast free of network support. They began recording the podcast from home, sticking 'Shameless Podcast' posters inside girls' bathrooms at universities, and engaging with listeners on social media.

Since then, Shameless has become the first of many Shameless Media podcasts. It has been downloaded over four million times as of August 2019, and has been written about in The New York Times, The Guardian, The Age, Marie Claire, and The Sydney Morning Herald. In 2018, Shameless was listed as Apple's 'Best of 2018' podcasts, and in 2019, was recognised as Australia's Most Popular Podcast at the Australian Podcast Awards. Shameless has also sold out live shows across Australia.

Michelle and Zara's first book "The Space Between" was released on the 1st of September 2020.

References

External links
 

2018 podcast debuts
Audio podcasts
Comedy and humor podcasts
Australian podcasts